James Stewart (died 1466) was a prelate from 15th century Scotland. Stewart was a member of the Stewart kindred of Lorne. He was Dean of Moray from 1435 until 19 May 1460, when he was provided to the bishopric. He was consecrated as Bishop of Moray sometime towards the end of the year. He resigned the see two years later in the papal curia in favour of his brother, David Stewart. He died  on 5 August 1466.

References

 Dowden, John, The Bishops of Scotland, ed. J. Maitland Thomson, (Glasgow, 1912)
 Keith, Robert, An Historical Catalogue of the Scottish Bishops: Down to the Year 1688, (London, 1924)
 Watt, D.E.R., Fasti Ecclesiae Scoticanae Medii Aevi ad annum 1638, 2nd Draft, (St Andrews, 1969)

1466 deaths
Bishops of Moray
Medieval Gaels from Scotland
People from Lorne, Scotland
15th-century Scottish Roman Catholic bishops
Burials at Elgin Cathedral
Year of birth unknown
Place of birth unknown
Treasurers of Scotland